This is a list of Bahram Beyzai's speeches.

Among other occupations, throughout his career Beyzai has been a relatively prolific speaker as an academic as well as a public intellectual. Most of his notable oral output consists of Persian lectures at a number of universities, most often in Iran and the United States, but also occasionally in countries as various as France, Scotland and Canada. The majority of these is lost forever, sometimes only surviving in names and dates of the events or classes. Some are available as voice recordings, either published in print as well, like "On the Situation of Theatre and Cinema" (1977), or not; and some, particularly in the later years of Beyzai's career, are published as videos.

Beyzai has had very few television and radio appearances. Nevertheless, his picture is preserved in some documentaries where he has been interviewed either about his work or else.

Public

Regular lectures

At the University of Tehran (1970s) 
"Oriental Theater"

At Stanford University (2010s) 
"The Iranian Cinema: Image and Meaning"
"Iranian Cinema in Diaspora"
"Contemporary Iranian Theater"

Spoken messages 
 to Asghar Farhadi, congratulating the Academy Award for Best Foreign Language Film for The Salesman

Interviews and talks

Making-ofs 
 Travelers on the Way
 A Brief Dossier for Killing Mad Dogs

Other documentaries

About himself 
 Bahram Beyzai: A Cultural Legend

Else 
 Ahmad Shamlou: Master Poet of Liberty
 Iran, une révolution cinématographique (2006)

Journalistic 
List in Persian

References 

Beyzai
speeches